Panathlon International (PI) is a global umbrella organisation of "Panathlon clubs", which are nonprofit non-governmental organisations promoting sports ethics and fair play and opposing discrimination and politicisation in sport. PI is recognised by the International Olympic Committee (IOC) and is a member of  the International Fair Play Committee (CIFP) and associate member of the Global Association of International Sports Federations. The name "Panathlon" is from Greek  "all" +  "sport".

PI has more than 300 clubs in 30 countries in 4 continents, with a head office in Rapallo, Italy. As well as promotional work, PI and its members support research on topics concerning sport and its relations with society.

History
The first club was created on 12 June 1951 in Venice by Mario Viali of the Italian National Olympic Committee and some friends, mostly members of the local Rotary Club. Ludovico Foscari coined the name "Panathlon" and the motto , Latin for "[Panathlon] unites by means of sport". In 1953 seven clubs formed the Italian Panathlon Association. In 1960 Panathlon International was formed by members from Italy, Switzerland, Spain, and France.

 there is no Panathlon International club in the United Kingdom. On that date PI met with the Panathlon Foundation, a UK charity promoting youth disabled sport, to discuss co-operation with a view to enabling a UK PI club to use the name "Panathlon".

Goals
As an independent organization, Panathlon aims at: 
 promoting culture and ethics in sport 
 working together with organizations having the same goals
 presenting suggestions to handle acute and chronic problems in sport
 stimulating reflection and discussion on “ethics and integrity” (both values-based and rules-based approach) in modern sport based on scientific research

Actions
Panathlon's actions on integrity in sport have been fuelled by the fact that sport is often beset by poor practice, corruption, and harmful behaviours. Sport has to remain credible and must be continuously proactive if it wants to sustain its positive values. Panathlon is therefore considering what should be done to make that the positive potentials of sport can be prevail in the complex commercialized and globalized sporting landscape of the 21st century. Its position is that it would be naïve to think that sport automatically elicits and promotes positive effects and that remaining silent on obvious aberrations would condone complicity.

A modern integrity management framework aims at preventing serious integrity violations on the one hand (rules-based approach), and promoting integrity through stimulating understanding, commitment and capacity for ethical decision making on the other hand (values-based approach). To direct its actions, Panathlon International adopts the “values-based approach” which is about supporting and stimulating (code of ethics) and limits itself to stimulate sport federations and sport authorities to address controlling and sanctioning (code of ethics). The Panathlon Declaration of Ethics in Youth Sports adopted by UNICEF, the IOC, SportAccord, international federations (FIFA, UCI, IAAF, FIBA, FIG and others), organizations (ENGSO, EUPEA and others) as well as National Olympic Committees (Belgium, Netherlands, Uruguay and others) exemplifies this values-based approach.

Presidents

Flambeau d'Or
The Flambeau d'Or (Golden Torch) is an award that is presented every four years. It aims to reward distinguished international sport personalities. It is awarded in three categories for outstanding achievements in sport promotion, sport culture and organisation.

References

Sources

Citations

External links
Official Site

International sports organizations
International organisations based in Italy
Sports organizations established in 1960
Sportsmanship
Discrimination
Politics and sports